Galtaji is an ancient Hindu pilgrimage about 10 km away from Jaipur, in the Indian state of Rajasthan. The site consists of a series of temples built into a narrow crevice in the ring of hills that surrounds Jaipur.  A natural spring emerges high on the hill and flows downward, filling a series of  sacred kunds (water tanks) in which pilgrims bathe.  Visitors and pilgrims can ascend the crevasse, continuing past the highest water pool to a hilltop temple from there are views of Jaipur and its fortifications spreads out across the valley floor.  It is believed that a Saint named Galav lived here, practiced meditation, and did penance (tapasya).

Shri Galta Peeth

Built within a mountain pass in the Aravalli Hills 10 km. east of Jaipur, Since the early 15th century Galtaji has been a retreat for Hindu ascetics belonging to the Vaishnava Ramanuja sect. It is said to have been in the occupation of yogis for a long time; Payohari Krishnadas, a Ramanuji saint, i.e. a follower of the Ramanuj Sampradaya came to Galta in the early 15th century and, by his yogic powers, drove away other yogis from the place. Galta was northern India's first Vaishnava Ramanuja Peeth and became the one of the most important centres of the Ramanuja sect. The temple features a number of pavilions with rounded roofs, carved pillars and painted walls. The complex is set around a natural spring and waterfalls that create 7 Holy Ponds.

Monkeys

These rhesus macaques were featured in National Geographic Channel's Rebel Monkeys series and "Thar Desert - Sacred sand" episode of the Wildest India television series.

The Sun Temple 
There is a small temple on the top of the hill dedicated to the Sun God. It is known as Surya Mandir.

Water tanks

The temple is known for its natural springs, the water from which accumulates in tanks (kunds).  There are seven tanks, the holiest being the Galta Kund, which never goes dry.  It is considered auspicious to bathe in the waters of Galtaji, especially on Makar Sankranti, and thousands come to bathe every year.

References

External links

monkey temple India Galta Ji 
Galta Ji Temple Complete Guide
Rajasthan Pilgrimage - Hindu Temples - Galta Ji

Hindu temples in Rajasthan
Hindu pilgrimage sites in India
Tourist attractions in Jaipur
Springs of India
Temple tanks in India
Hindu temples in Jaipur
Landforms of Rajasthan